The 2021 Tour de Ski was the 15th edition of the Tour de Ski and part of the 2020–21 FIS Cross-Country World Cup. The World Cup stage event began in Val Müstair, Switzerland on 1 January 2021 and conclude with the Final Climb stage in Val di Fiemme, Italy, on 10 January 2021. The tour was the second edition starting in Val Müstair. The last stage known as the Final Climb was held as a mass start for the second time. Alexander Bolshunov from Russia and Therese Johaug from Norway were the title defenders. However, Johaug and other athletes from Norway decided to skip the Tour de Ski with concerns about competing and travelling during coronavirus pandemic.

Bolshunov defended his title on this year's Tour de Ski, finishing in the overall standings with a three minute margin from the runner-up. Jessie Diggins won her first Tour de Ski cup; her best result prior to that was third, which she reached at the 2017–18 Tour de Ski. She became the first American to win the Tour de Ski.

Schedule

Overall leadership 
Two main individual classifications were contested in the 2021 Tour de Ski, as well as a team competition. The most important is the overall standings, calculated by adding each skier's finishing times on each stage. Time bonuses (time subtracted) were awarded at both sprint stages and at intermediate points during mass start stage 6. In the sprint stages, the winners were awarded 60 bonus seconds, while on mass start stage 6 the first ten skiers past the intermediate point received from 15 seconds to 1 seconds. The skier with the lowest cumulative time was the overall winner of the Tour de Ski. For the second time in Tour history, the skier leading the overall standings wore a yellow bib.

The second competition is the points standings, which replaced the sprint competition from past editions. The skiers who will receive the highest number of points during the Tour will win the points standings. The points available for each stage finish are determined by the stage's type. The leader will be identified by a red bib.

The final competition is a team competition. This is calculated using the finishing times of the best two skiers of both genders per team on each stage; the leading team is the team with the lowest cumulative time.

Final standings

Overall standings

Points standings

Team standings

Stages

Stage 1
1 January 2021, Val Müstair, Switzerland
 Bonus seconds to the 30 skiers that qualifies for the quarter-finals, distributed as following:
 Final: 60–54–48–46–44–42
 Semi-final: 32–30–28–26–24–22
 Quarter-final: 10–10–10–8–8–8–8–8–6–6–6–6–6–4–4–4–4–4

Stage 2
2 January 2021, Val Müstair, Switzerland
No bonus seconds were awarded on this stage.

Stage 3
3 January 2021, Val Müstair, Switzerland
Pursuit start lists are based on Tour de Ski overall standings after two stages.
No bonus seconds were awarded on this stage.

Stage 4
5 January 2021, Toblach, Italy
No bonus seconds are awarded on this stage.

Stage 5
6 January 2021, Toblach, Italy
Pursuit start lists are based only on Stage 4 results (not as in the past on the current Tour de Ski overall standings). In fact, stage 5 finish differences are cumulative results of stages 4 and 5
No bonus seconds are awarded on this stage.

Stage 6
8 January 2021, Val di Fiemme, Italy

Stage 6 bonus seconds
 Men: 1 intermediate sprint, bonus seconds to the 10 first skiers (15–12–10–8–6–5–4–3–2–1) past the intermediate point.
 Women: 1 intermediate sprint, bonus seconds to the 10 first skiers (15–12–10–8–6–5–4–3–2–1) past the intermediate point.
 No bonus seconds are awarded at the finish

Stage 7
9 January 2021, Val di Fiemme, Italy
 Bonus seconds to the 30 skiers that qualifies for the quarter-finals, distributed as following:
 Final: 60–54–48–46–44–42
 Semi-final: 32–30–28–26–24–22
 Quarter-final: 10–10–10–8–8–8–8–8–6–6–6–6–6–4–4–4–4–4

Stage 8
10 January 2021, Val di Fiemme, Italy

The race for "Fastest of the Day" counts for 2020–21 FIS Cross-Country World Cup points. No bonus seconds are awarded on this stage.

World Cup points distribution 
The table shows the number of 2020–21 FIS Cross-Country World Cup points to win in the 2021 Tour de Ski for men and women.

References

Sources

 
 

2020–21 FIS Cross-Country World Cup
2021
2021 in Swiss sport
2021 in Italian sport
2021 in cross-country skiing
January 2021 sports events in Europe
January 2021 sports events in Italy